"Hillbillies" is a song recorded by American country music group Hot Apple Pie.  It was released in March 2005 as the first single from the album Hot Apple Pie.  The song reached #26 on the Billboard Hot Country Songs chart. Lead singer Brady Seals wrote the song with Greg McDowell and Kizzy Plush.

Critical reception
Michael Sudhalter of Country Standard Time praised the song in his review of the album, saying that it was a "humorous look at the pleasures of country life with a beat that combines country with funk and soul."

Chart performance

References

2005 debut singles
2005 songs
Hot Apple Pie songs
Songs written by Brady Seals
Song recordings produced by Richard Landis
DreamWorks Records singles